Emilio "Leo" Young (born February 28, 2005) is an American long-distance runner. He represented his home country in the 2023 World Athletics Cross Country Championships where he led his team to a bronze medal in the (U20) Junior race a week and a half before his 18th birthday.  His 16th place was the highest from a non-East African country.  He qualified for the World Championships by winning the U20 race at the USA Cross Country Championships.

While running for Newbury Park High School, he was the only person to be a part of three National Championship cross country teams over a four-year period, interrupted by the COVID-19 pandemic. Each of those races was won by a teammate, his older brother Nico Young in 2019, Colin Sahlman in 2021, and Aaron Sahlman in 2022.  Leo was the last competitor each of the Sahlman brothers passed en route to their victory.  With Aaron, Colin and twin brother Lex, his team set the National 4x1 Mile run record.  Their time of 16:29.31 took  seconds off the previous mark. Leo ran a 4:00.77-mile as a high school junior.

Lex and Leo are Youtube vloggers, documenting their adventures including training and racing under the handle L&L.

2019
At the Nike Cross Nationals in Portland, Oregon, Leo was the lone Freshman on the champion Newbury Park team led by his brother Nico, then a Junior.  The 2020 season was cancelled just as it was starting due to COVID-19.

2021
At the early season Woodbridge Invitational, Leo improved upon brother Nico's course record, running 14:38.1, considered a National Record for 3 miles.  The Newbury Park team set the National Record for a team over the 3 mile distance.

At the Clovis Invitational, Leo was second behind Colin as Newbury Park took the top 4 places.  Their team time set the Woodward Park  course record.

At the CIF State Championships also on the Woodward course, Colin and Leo improved upon Nico's #2 time ever on the course.  With Lex a second behind, Newbury Park had the four best times on the course behind German Fernandez' course record from 2007.  The team improved upon its own course record while scoring 16 points.  Only a fifth place score by Zachary Ayers of Davis High School interrupted a perfect score.

With the season still interrupted by COVID, the Nike Cross Nationals was cancelled.  The top national teams flocked to the Garmin RunningLane Cross Country Championships in Huntsville, Alabama making it the de facto National Championships.  Going into the race, the National High School Record for a 5K cross country course was 14:10 from Dathan Ritzenhein in 2000.  In this race, the top 3 from Newbury Park all broke that time, Colin taking the win in 14:03.29, Leo second in 14:05.07 and Lex third at 14:05.49.  The top five Newbury Park runners averaged 14:24.  All seven finished under 15:00.  It has been called the greatest high school cross country team in history.

2022
Leo began the track season at the Sundown Track Series #2 meet in Azusa, California, running 3200 metres in 8:39.57.

The next performance was Newbury Park's attempt to break the national 4 × mile relay record at the New Balance Indoor Nationals.  Leo ran the second leg in 4:06.86 as the team took the record from 17:01.81 to 16:29.31.

A week later he came tantalizingly close to breaking the 4 minute mile as a high school Junior, running 4:00.77 again at Azusa.

At the Arcadia Invitational, Leo ran 3000 metres 8:27.31 on an off night.  Lex finished 20 seconds ahead of him while challenging Colin for the win.

In August, Leo and Lex committed to run for Stanford University.

External links

References

2005 births
Living people
American male long-distance runners
People from Camarillo, California